Two ships of the Brazilian Navy have been named Almirante Tamandaré:

 , launched in 1890 and stricken in 1920
 , launched in 1938 as USS St. Louis, acquired by Brazil in 1951 and stricken in 1976

See also
 Almirante Tamandaré (disambiguation)



Brazilian Navy ship names